Barltrop is a surname. Notable people with the surname include:

Bojana Barltrop (born 1949), Yugoslav artist and photographer
Mabel Barltrop (1866–1934), English religious leader
Robert Barltrop (1922–2009), English socialist activist, essayist, biographer, artist, and illustrator

See also
Bartrop